The Berne Trial (also known under the name of "Zionistenprozess") was a famous court case in Berne, Switzerland which took place between 1933 and 1935.  Two organisations, the Swiss Federation of Jewish Communities and the Bernese Jewish Community sued the far-right Swiss National Front for distributing anti-Jewish propaganda. The trial focussed on the Front's use of the fraudulent antisemitic text, The Protocols of the Elders of Zion. Ultimately decided in favour of the plaintiffs, the Front was ordered to pay a symbolic fine and court costs.  However, the trial became significant both for the international coverage and also for the extensive evidence presented, demonstrating the falsehoods contained in The Protocols.

Background

Meeting in Bern's Casino
The plaintiffs, the Schweizerischer Israelitischer Gemeindebund (SIG) and the Israelitische Kultusgemeinde Bern, sued the Bund Nationalsozialistischer Eidgenossen (BNSE) (Swiss president: Theodor Fischer at Zurich) which distributed anti-Semitic pamphlets during a meeting of June 13, 1933 organized by the National Front and the Heimatwehr in the Casino of Berne (with former chief of the Swiss General Staff and Frontist Emil Sonderegger as main speaker). The National Front distributed a print "Die zionistischen Protokolle, 13. Aufl. 1933"  edited and introduced by the German anti-Semitic writer Theodor Fritsch. Silvio Schnell, the young man responsible for distribution of publications of the National Front was sued because he sold the print during the meeting. Theodor Fischer (BNSE) was sued as author of the pamphlet and editor of the journal "Der Eidgenosse" (Swiss Confederate) which published an offensive anti-Semitic article written by Alberto Meyer, Zurich, in the manner of Julius Streicher.

"Protocols of the Elders of Zion"
Frontist propaganda declared the Protocols of the Elders of Zion as authentic, i.e. as a secret program produced by Jewry in order to gain worldwide political power and control by every possible means (e.g. supporting corrupt politicians, bombing in underground-stations, economic measures etc.). Fritsch claimed in his incriminated edition that the Protocols of the Elders of Zion were produced during the First Zionist Congress at Basel (1897) and cited Rabbi Mordecai Ehrenpreis (1869–1951) from Stockholm Synagogue, who participated at the Basel Congress 1897, in a misleading manner as a pretended proof for Jewish authorship in the foreword of his incriminated print.

Litigation

Main Court Session, October 29–31, 1934

The trial soon focussed on the plagiarism and forgery of the notorious Protocols of the Elders of Zion. In the Main Session of 1934 witnesses were cited: Participants of the First Zionist Congress at Basel (1897), among them Rabbi M. Ehrenpreis; then several Russian witnesses living in exile (mainly at Paris) to tell the judge about a possible Russian origin of the Protocols of the Elders of Zion (as a forgery by the Tsarist police to promote anti-Semitic feelings during the time of Pogroms). The alleged link between Freemasonry and Jews was also a point of interest and masonic witnesses were cited. The plaintiffs nominated these witnesses and paid a considerable amount to the Court to make the appearance of those important eyewitnesses possible, among them also Chaim Weizmann, the future first president of the state of Israel. The only witness nominated by the defendants was Alfred Zander, Zurich, who wrote some articles on the Protocols of the Elders of Zion in the newspaper "Der eiserne Besen" (the iron broom) of the National Front.

Witnesses at the Main Session 1934

First witness
 Chaim Weizmann, London

Witnesses about Russia
 Count A. M. du Chayla
 Sergei Svatikov
 Vladimir Burtsev
 Boris Nicolaevsky
 H. Sliosberg (a Jewish lawyer in Russia)
 Pavel Milyukov

Witnesses who participated in the First Zionist Congress at Basel (1897)
 Mayer Ebner, Cernauti/Romania (1872–1955)
 Marcus Ehrenpreis, Stockholm (chief rabbi)
 David Farbstein, Zurich (1868–1953)
 Max Bodenheimer, Amsterdam (1865–1940)
 Franz Sieber (shorthand writer)
 Hermann Dietrich (shorthand writer)
 Otto Zoller (editor at the "Basler Nachrichten 1897)

Witnesses about Freemasonry
 Theodor Tobler, Berne (founder of well-known Toblerone)
 Eduard Welti, Berne

Only witness of the defendants
 Alfred Zander (Swiss frontlist who wrote articles in the "Eiserner Besen"/the iron broom)(1905–1997)

Witnesses cited, but not appearing before the court
 Philip Graves, London (gave written testimony to the judge)
 , Vienna/Jerusalem (cited, but not able to come)
 Alberto Meyer, Zurich (author of the incriminated antiSemite article "Schweizermädchen..." in "Der Eidgenosse")

Main Court Session, April 29 – May 13, 1935: Three experts

In the Main Session 1935 three experts intervened: (1) C. A. Loosli, Bern-Bümpliz  (expert appointed by the judge); (2) Arthur Baumgarten, Basel  (expert appointed by the plaintiffs); (3) Ulrich Fleischhauer, Erfurt/Germany (anti-Semitic expert appointed by the defendants). The appointed experts had to answer four questions by the judge of the case, Walter Meyer:
Was the Protocols of the Elders of Zion a forgery?
Was it plagiarized?
If it was, what was its source?
Do the Protocols fall under the term Schundliteratur?
Further questions to be answered by the experts were formulated by the plaintiffs. During this session no further witnesses were heard.

While the experts Arthur Baumgarten and C. A. Loosli declared the Protocols of the Elders of Zion as a plagiarism and a forgery produced by helpers of the tsarist Russian Okhrana, anti-Semitic expert Ulrich Fleischhauer claimed that they were genuine but of uncertain authorship, possibly composed by the Jewish author Ahad Haam and passed at a secret meeting of B'nai B'rith which purportedly took place in 1897 during the first Zionist Congress at Basel, Switzerland.

Decision and appeal
Eventually, the defendants Theodor Fischer and Silvio Schnell were sentenced by Judge Walter Meyer in his verdict, while three other defendants were acquitted. The penalty was a quite symbolic fine: Fr. 50 (Fischer) and Fr. 20 (Schnell). However, the defendants found guilty would have to pay a larger sum of the costs of the trial and some of the costs of the plaintiffs. Commenting on his verdict in the court, judge Walter Meyer said he was convinced by his evaluation of the testimonies of the witnesses and the statements of the experts that the Protocols of the Elders of Zion are a forgery and "Schundliteratur" that might instigate crimes by agitation against a minority.

Theodor Fischer himself and the lawyer of Silvio Schnell (Hans Ruef, Berne) immediately appealed to the Berner Obergericht which acquitted both defendants in 1937 on purely formal legal grounds, arguing that the term "Schundliteratur" of the Bernese Law is not applicable to "political publications" but only to "immoral (obscene) publications". The Berner Obergericht refused the obligation of the private plaintiffs to pay the costs of defence of the acquitted defendants explaining that "the one who circulates such sort of most vulgar instigating articles has to pay himself the costs resulting from them." Fischer had to pay Fr. 100 to the state fees of the trial (Fr. 28'000, paid by the Canton of Berne).

Funding
The defendants sought financing from the German Nazi party but were unsatisfied with the support they received.  They also received support from multiple anti-Jewish organizations, especially the society Welt-Dienst (World-Service) of Ulrich Fleischhauer, the expert appointed by the defendants. Joseph Goebbels'  Ministry of Public Enlightenment and Propaganda initially promised support but later withdrew it. The plaintiffs and their supporting organizations financed a larger part of the costs of the citation of witnesses and of the pay of the experts C. A. Loosli and A. Baumgarten.

Important archival material, e.g. the so-called Russian Documents transmitted to expert Loosli
The various findings of the court, regarding the series of events leading to the publication of the Protocols of the Elders of Zion, are now regarded as a treasure trove of archival material for scholars and historians.

Of special interest are the so-called Russian Documents transmitted to the expert C. A. Loosli with permission of the Soviet government by the librarian Tager in Moscow for personal use only, copies of authentic material from the tsarist administration, especially on the Russian Okhrana and on the Russian Jews. , a Swiss lawyer in Berne of Russian-Jewish origin speaking both Russian and German, had contacts to the Soviet administration and played an important role in procuring the Russian documents and contacting various Russian witnesses to appear at the court in 1934 (who were all opposed to Bolshevism).

Further reading
Hadassa Ben-Itto: The Lie that Wouldn't Die, The Protocols of the Elders of Zion. Pref. Lord Woolf, Lord Chief Justice; for. Judge Edward R. Korman. Vallentine Mitchell, London/Portland, OR 2005. 
"Former Israeli judge Hadassa Ben-Itto retired from her bench to study the record of the trial in Berne, and published this book on the results of her research in 2005".
Urs Lüthi: Der Mythos von der Weltverschwörung: die Hetze der Schweizer Frontisten gegen Juden und Freimaurer, am Beispiel des Berner Prozesses um die "Protokolle der Weisen von Zion". Helbing & Lichtenhahn, Basel 1992. 
"A scholarly work on the Berne Trial is Urs Lüthi's Der Mythos von der Weltverschwörung (1992)".
Norman Cohn: Warrant for Genocide. Serif, London 1967, 1996. 
John S. Curtiss: An Appraisal of the Protocols of Zion. Columbia University Press, New York 1942.
Michael Hagemeister: Russian Émigrés in the Bern Trial of the 'Protocols of the Elders of Zion' (1933–1935), in: Cahiers Parisiens / Parisian Notebooks, 5, 2009, pp. 375–391.
Michael Hagemeister: The 'Protocols of the Elders' of Zion in court. The Bern trials, 1933–1937, in: Esther Webman (ed.), The Global Impact of 'The Protocols of the Elders of Zion''' (London, New York: Routledge, 2011), pp.  241–253. Revised and expanded version in 
Michael Hagemeister: Die «Protokolle der Weisen von Zion» vor Gericht. Der Berner Prozess 1933–1937 und die «antisemitische Internationale». Chronos, Zürich 2017. (Veröffentlichungen des Archivs für Zeitgeschichte der ETH Zürich; 10). 645 pp. 
Catherine Nicault: Le procès des "Protocoles des Sages de Sion". Une tentative de riposte juive à l'antisémitisme dans les années 1930, in: Vingtième Siècle. Revue d'histoire'', No. 53 (Jan. – Mar., 1997), pp. 68–84.

References

External links
Pictures of the Berne Trial
Some authentic documents of the Berne Trial (copied with kind permission of Staatsarchiv des Kantons Bern) may be consulted online (in German)
Bern Trial on the Protocols of the Elders of Zion Collection (AR 34) at the Leo Baeck Institute, New York includes digitized original documents from the trial

See also
 Ulrich Fleischhauer (anti-Semitic expert)
 Maurice Joly
 Masonic conspiracy theories
 Serge Nilus (visited by witness du Chayla in Russia)
 Mikhail Raslovlev (informant of Graves about Joly's book)
 Elias Tcherikower (scholar)

Protocols of the Elders of Zion
Antisemitism in Switzerland
Russia–Switzerland relations
Human rights in Switzerland
Political history of Switzerland
Swiss case law
1933 in Switzerland
1934 in Switzerland
1935 in Switzerland
1937 in Switzerland
Germany–Switzerland relations
Obscenity law
1935 in case law
20th century in Bern
Trials in Switzerland